The 1959–60 DFB-Pokal was the 17th season of the annual German football cup competition. It began on 7 September 1960 and ended on 5 October 1960. 4 teams competed in the tournament of two rounds. In the final Borussia Mönchengladbach defeated Karlsruher SC 3 – 2.

Matches

Qualification round

Semi-finals

* The game was nullified and repeated because FK Pirmasens lined up a player (Rolf Fritzsche) who was not entitled to play.

Replay

Final

References

External links
 Official site of the DFB 
 Kicker.de 
 1960 results at Fussballdaten.de 

1959-60
1959–60 in German football cups